Alfred Price Burnett (23 July 1922 – February 1977) was a Scottish footballer who played as a centre forward. Burnett began his career in the mid-1940s with Dundee United, featuring in just one match before heading south to join Barrow. At the end of the decade, Burnett had a brief spell with Lincoln City, but left the club in June 1950 after joining the police.

Burnett, who died in 1977, served in the Royal Air Force at Walney Island Airfield prior to playing for Barrow.

References

External links
 

1922 births
Footballers from Aberdeen
1977 deaths
Scottish footballers
Scottish Football League players
English Football League players
Dundee United F.C. players
Barrow A.F.C. players
Lincoln City F.C. players
Association football forwards
20th-century Royal Air Force personnel